Duck Quacks Don't Echo is a British television comedy panel game show that aired on Sky1 from 7 February 2014 to 12 October 2017. It was hosted by Lee Mack.

Rounds
Each episode has three rounds.
 Fact Off - The three guests reveal their favourite fact and try to see if it is true.  The fact proving segments are narrated by John Sergeant.
 Fact Finder - Each of the three guests choose an audience member who has a fact which is given to three experts who reveal if the facts are true or not.
Chemical engineer David Wharton
Cell biology and genetics Dr Emily Grossman
Rocket scientist Dr Simon Foster
 Space scientist Dr Maggie Aderin-Pocock
 Mack's Fact - The guest with the highest score takes part in a fact Mack wants to prove.

Thirty-minute edits of (at least) Series 1 exist, in which the Fact Finder round is absent, and no points appear to be awarded throughout.

Episodes
46 episodes were produced, with the final episode of each series (the eighth episode) being a best-of compilation. The final episode for series 6 (a best-of compilation) was unaired.

Series 1 (2014)

Series 2 (2014)

Series 3 (2015)

Series 4 (2016)

Series 5 (2016)

Series 6 (2017)

Reception
Writing for The Arts Desk, Matthew Wright said of the first episode "With QIs questions about Noam Chomsky substituted for lightweight popular psychology and an investigation into dog urine, there's not enough substance to bear the weight of the lengthy investigations."

References

External links

2014 British television series debuts
2017 British television series endings
British panel games
English-language television shows
Sky UK original programming